Pearson may refer to:

Organizations

Education
Lester B. Pearson College, Victoria, British Columbia, Canada
Pearson College (UK), London, owned by Pearson PLC
Lester B. Pearson High School (disambiguation)

Companies
Pearson PLC, a UK-based international media conglomerate, best known as a book publisher
Pearson Education, the textbook division of Pearson PLC
Pearson-Longman, an imprint of Pearson Education
Pearson Yachts

Places
Pearson, California (disambiguation)
Pearson, Georgia, a US city
Pearson, Texas, an unincorporated community in the US
Pearson, Victoria, a ghost town in Australia
Pearson, Wisconsin, an unincorporated community in the US
Toronto Pearson International Airport, in Toronto, Ontario, Canada
Pearson Field, in Vancouver, Washington, US
Pearson Island, an island in South Australia which is part of the Pearson Isles
Pearson Isles, an island group in South Australia

Other uses
Pearson (surname)
Pearson correlation coefficient, a statistical measure known as Pearson's r
Pearson (motorcycle), a British motorcycle with an Ateliers de Construction Mecanique l'Aster engine
Pearson (TV series), an American television series that is a spin-off of Suits

See also
Pearson's (disambiguation)
Pearson Peacekeeping Centre, a Canadian NGO supporting international peace
Pearson Air Museum
Pearson v. Chung, $67 million lawsuit over a pair of pants
Justice Pearson (disambiguation)
Persson